Dateland is both a CDP and a populated place in Yuma County, Arizona, United States. It is in an area well known for date palm dates.

Dateland has the ZIP Code of 85333; in 2000, the population of the 85333 ZCTA was 852.

The community is part of the Yuma Metropolitan Statistical Area.

The Dateland Food Court is home to the self-proclaimed "World Famous Date Shakes."

Demographics

History 
Dateland began as a road stop in the 1920s. During World War II, Dateland was home to Dateland Air Force Auxiliary Field. After the closure of the airfield, the land was subdivided in the 1970s. The developers of one subdivision on the former airfield, El Camino Del Sol, were convicted of fraud in 1977. Most of Dateland consists of undeveloped lots.

Climate
This area has a large amount of sunshine year round due to its stable descending air and high pressure.  According to the Köppen Climate Classification system, Dateland has a desert climate, abbreviated "Bwh" on climate maps.

Infrastructure

Utilities
Dateland is served by the following utilities:
 Arizona Public Service – electric
 Arizona Telephone Co. (a subsidiary of TDS Telecom) – telephone
 Dateland Public Service Co. (a tax-exempt utility) – water

See also 

 List of historic properties in Dateland, Arizona
 San Cristobal Valley

References

External links 
 
 
 Dateland community website

Populated places in the Sonoran Desert
Census-designated places in Yuma County, Arizona